Odontelia is a genus of moths of the family Noctuidae.

Selected species
Odontelia daphnadeparisae Kravchenko, Ronkay, Speidel, Mooser & Müller, 2007

References
Natural History Museum Lepidoptera genus database

Hadeninae